Peter Derek Miller (4 December 1929 – 17 July 2012) was an English professional footballer who played as a half back.

Career
Born in Hoyland, Miller signed for Bradford City in August 1952. He made 18 league appearances for the club, scoring twice. He left the club in 1956 to sign for Grimsby Town, and also played for Frickley Colliery.

Sources

References

1929 births
2012 deaths
English footballers
Bradford City A.F.C. players
Grimsby Town F.C. players
Frickley Athletic F.C. players
English Football League players
Association football defenders